Leskovec is a dispersed settlement in the Pohorje Hills in the Municipality of Slovenska Bistrica in northeastern Slovenia. It lies on the local road from Stari Log to Spodnja Nova Vas, southwest of Pragersko. The area is part of the traditional region of Styria. It is now included with the rest of the municipality in the Drava Statistical Region.

References

External links
Leskovec at Geopedia

Populated places in the Municipality of Slovenska Bistrica